The KPL Awards, also known as the KPL Footballer of the Year Awards (FOYA), refer to an awards ceremony held to honour association football players, coaches, officials and journalists participating in the Kenyan Premier League. They are conferred by the Football Kenya Federation.

History
Winners are highlighted in bold and placed in non-indented bullets (  •  ). Nominees are placed in order from first to third place in indented bullets. If there is more than one winner (nominees both placed in non-indented bullets) or more than one runner-up (nominees both placed in one indented bullet with a line break separating them), then the award was shared between the winners.

2009

The 2009 KPL Awards were held on December 9, 2009 at the Panari Hotel in Nairobi.

Source: michezonet.com

2010

The 2010 KPL Awards were held on November 24, 2011 at the Safari Park Hotel in Nairobi.

Source: michezoafrika.com

2011

The 2011 KPL Awards were held on December 7, 2011 at the Safari Park Hotel in Nairobi.
{| class="wikitable" width="50%"
|-
! style="background:#000000; color: #FFFFFF" | Player and team awards
|-
! style="background:#EEDD82;" | Player of the Year
|-
| valign="top" |
  Kevin Kimani − Mathare United
  Charles Okwemba − A.F.C. Leopards
  Stephen Waruru − Ulinzi Stars
|-
! Young Player of the Year
|-
| valign="top" |
  Rama Salim – Congo JMJ United
  Dan Sserunkuma − Nairobi City Stars
  Eric Okoth − Kenya Commercial Bank
|-
! Fair Play Player of the Year
|-
| valign="top" |
  Vincent Nyaberi − Thika United
  David Juma − Western Stima
  Anthony Kimani − Mathare United
|-
! style="background:#EEDD82;" | Team of the Year
|-
| valign="top" |
 Tusker
 Ulinzi Stars
 Sofapaka
|-
! Fair Play Team of the Year
|-
| valign="top" |
 Rangers
 Ulinzi Stars
 Western Stima
|-
! Golden Boot
|-
| valign="top" |
  Stephen Waruru − Ulinzi Stars
  Mike Baraza – A.F.C. Leopards Clifford Alwanga - Kenya Commercial Bank Kevin Kimani - Mathare United Hugo Nzangu - Sony Sugar
|-
! Goalkeeper of the Year
|-
| valign="top" |
  Boniface Oluoch − Tusker
  Jacktone Odhiambo − Ulinzi Stars
  Lawrence Webo − Rangers
|-
! Defender of the Year
|-
| valign="top" |
  Pascal Ochieng − Rangers
  Eric Masika − Gor Mahia
  Joseph Shikokoti − Tusker
|-
! Midfielder of the Year
|-
| valign="top" |
  Kevin Kimani − Mathare United
  Charles Okwemba − A.F.C. Leopards
  Humphrey Mieno – Sofapaka
|-
! style="background:#000000; color: #FFFFFF" | Managerial awards
|-
! style="background:#EEDD82;" | Head coach of the Year
|-
| valign="top" |
  Sammy Omollo – Tusker
  Benjamin Nyangweso – Ulinzi Stars
  Francis Kimanzi − Sofapaka
|-
! Team manager of the Year
|-
| valign="top" |
  Jack Gatheru - Karuturi Sports
  Neville Pudo - Tusker
  Jack Matanguta − Ulinzi Stars Willis Waliaula − Rangers
|-
! style="background:#000000; color: #FFFFFF" | Referee awards
|-
|-
! style="background:#EEDD82;" | Referee of the Year
|-
| valign="top" |
 Nasur Doka
 Sylvester Kirwa
 Davies Omweno
|-
! Assistant referee of the Year
|-
| valign="top" |
 Aden Marwa
 Mike Mwangi
 Jane Cherono
|-
! style="background:#000000; color: #FFFFFF" | Journalism awards
|-
! Print journalist of the Year
|-
| valign="top" |
  Gilbert Wandera − The Standard
  Isaac Swila − People Daily
  James Waindi – The Standard
|-
! Television presenter of the Year
|-
| valign="top" |
  David Kwalimwa – K24
  Hassan Juma – KTN
  Mike Okinyi – Citizen
|-
! Radio presenter/station of the Year
|-
| valign="top" |
  Diamond Okusimba,  Toldo Kuria and William Gathoki – Radio Jambo  Ali Hassan and  Steve Mukanggai – Radio Maisha
  Joseph Maroa – Milele FM
|-
! Photojournalist of the Year
|-
| valign="top" |
  Stafford Ondiego − The Standard  Kena Claude − People Daily
  Chris Omollo − Daily Nation
|-
! Chairman's Award
|-
| valign="top" |
 Futaa.com MichezoAfrika.com
 KenyanStar.co.ke
|}
Sources: michezoafrika.com and muchene.com

2012

The 2012 KPL Awards were held on November 16, 2012 at the Safari Park Hotel in Nairobi. There were 16 categories to be handled at the event.

Source: sportsnewsarena.com

2013

The 2013 KPL Awards were held at the Safari Park Hotel in Nairobi. 12 categories were handled at the event.

2014

The 2014 KPL Awards were held on 19 November 2014 at the Safari Park Hotel in Nairobi. 13 categories were handled at the event.

The award ceremony was criticised for the manner in which players, coaches and officials were nominated and awarded, with the Football Kenya Federation stating that it took "strong exception to the manner in which winners of the 2014 awards were named". The Standard journalist Rodgers Eshitemi said the awards "will go down as the most shambolic fete ever in Kenya's football history".

2015

The 2015 KPL Awards were held on 9 December 2015 at the Safari Park Hotel in Nairobi. 12 categories were handled at the event.

Notes
 1  The Young Player of the Year award is given to players at the age of 20 or under and is often also called the New Player of the Year or the New Young Player award.
 2  The Referee of the Year award is more commonly known as the Centre Referee of the Year''' award to avoid confusion with other official positions (assistant referee, etc.) All officials participating in the Kenyan Premier League are under the Football Kenya Federation and all have Kenyan nationality.

References

Awards
Association football trophies and awards
Kenyan awards
Annual events in Kenya